Ribi is a surname. Notable people with the surname include:

David Ribi (born 1987), English actor
Martha Ribi (1915–2010), Swiss politician